Coreontae Lamar DeBerry (born 2 September 1994) is an American professional basketball player. 

As a freshman at college, he measured 6-foot-9, 260 pounds and was considered an intriguing prospect at Mott Community College, which was considered as the 2nd best school in the United States at that time. After graduation, he went on to play for the Cincinnati Bearcats.

After College, his first professional team was in the Thailand Basketball League, where he led his team to the national championship. He went on to play professionally in the United States, Canada, Germany and Portugal.

References

External links
 ESPN Profile
 RealGM Profile
 Cincinnati Bearcats Bio

1994 births
Living people
American expatriate basketball people in Canada
American expatriate basketball people in Germany
American expatriate basketball people in Thailand
American men's basketball players
Basketball players from Michigan
Centers (basketball)
Cincinnati Bearcats men's basketball players
FC Schalke 04 Basketball players
Hutchinson Blue Dragons men's basketball players
People from Holland, Michigan
Windy City Bulls players
Holland High School (Michigan) alumni